Treaty of Bassein may refer to:

Treaty of Bassein (1534), between Sultan Bahadur of Gujarat and the Portuguese.
Treaty of Bassein (1802), between the British and Baji Rao II, the Maratha peshwa of Pune (Poona) in India